List of AMD K7 microprocessors may refer to:

 List of AMD Athlon processors
 List of AMD Athlon XP processors
 List of AMD Duron processors